Steven Heimkreiter (June 9, 1957 – December 3, 2020) was an American football linebacker in the National Football League (NFL) who played for the Baltimore Colts. He played college football at University of Notre Dame.

He died of cancer on December 3, 2020, in Fort Thomas, Kentucky at age 63.

References

1957 births
2020 deaths
Players of American football from Cincinnati
American football linebackers
Notre Dame Fighting Irish football players
Baltimore Colts players